Djúpivogur is a small town and municipality (Djúpavogshreppur ) located on a peninsula in the Austurland region in eastern Iceland, near the island of Papey and on the fjord Berufjörður.  The municipality was formed by the merger of rural communities Berunes , Buland , and Geithellur  on October 1, 1992.  The coastline consists of three fjords Berufjörður, Hamarsfjörður , and Álftafjörður.  The town of Djúpivogur is located on a peninsula between Berufjörður and Hamarsfjörður.

Approximately 900 m west of the town is a work of art named "Eggin í Gleðivík"  (The Eggs of Merry Bay) by Sigurður Guðmundsson.  The work is a replica of the eggs of 34 nesting birds in the area, and was installed in the summer of 2009.

Djúpivogur is home to Langabúð , one of Iceland's oldest commercial buildings. The south end dates back to 1790, but the building only took on its present appearance when the northern part was constructed in 1850. Langabúð served many purposes, being a warehouse and slaughterhouse. Today, it is home to a café, the heritage museum and an exhibition on the Icelandic sculptor Ríkarður Jónsson, who was native to the village.

Climate 
Djúpivogur features a cold tundra climate (Köppen: ET). Approximately 5 kilometres west of Djúpivogur lies Teigarhorn , a farm on the shores of Berufjörður, where weather observations began in 1874. It is one of the oldest weather stations in the country and holds the record for the highest temperature ever recorded in Iceland,  recorded on June 22, 1939. It is also claimed that Teigarhorn reached  in September 1940, but that is not recognized by the Icelandic Meteorological Office. Temperatures above  are very rare in Iceland, and have occurred only 5 times since weather observations first began in Iceland in the 19th century. Teigarhorn features a cold tundra climate (Köppen: ET) because it doesn't have any month that has a mean temperature above , but the winter temperatures are mild for a cold tundra climate, and thus closely resembles a mild tundra climate or a subpolar oceanic climate (Cfc), the climate generally seen in coastal Iceland.

History 
By the early nineteenth century, Djúpivogur was 'a tiny port with a Danish colonial trading base'. Hans Jonatan, who had been a slave in Copenhagen, escaped there and became one of Iceland's first people of colour.

Culture 
Djúpivogur is the first and only Cittaslow town in Iceland. Cittaslow's goals include improving the quality of life in towns by slowing down its overall pace, especially in a city's use of spaces and the flow of life and traffic through them. Cittaslow is part of a cultural trend known as the slow movement.

See also 
 Æðarstein Lighthouse

References

External links 

 Djupivogur
 Djúpivogur. Picture gallery from islandsmyndir.is

Populated places in Eastern Region (Iceland)
Municipalities of Iceland
States and territories disestablished in 2020